Yu Yonghe was a traveler from China whose adventures are recorded in Small Sea Travel Diaries (裨海紀遊). The book contributes significantly to the research on the historical development of Taiwan (Formosa) in the seventeenth century.

Biography
Yu Yonghe was born before 1650 in the city of Renhe, Zhejiang province. Modern scholars have regarded Yu as one unique figure of his time because of several factors. For instance, although traveling was not uncommon at his time, Yu was known to have travelled to every corner of Fujian and even to Taiwan – a desolate and barbaric island back in the seventeenth century. Furthermore, shown both in his accounts of the Taiwanese aborigines and Zheng family (entitled 番境補遺, 偽鄭逸事, resp.), his knowledge of the foreigners and interest in foreign lands were extraordinary for his era.

Under the consent of the Fujian officials, Yu travelled to Taiwan following the explosion of the Fuzhou gunpowder stores in 1696 to mine sulfur. Yu's voyage began at the coast to Xiamen, crossing the Taiwan Strait and coming to a halt in Penghu before arriving in Tainan. Yu then journeyed northward to Tamsui and Beitou where he bought amorphous sulfur from local Aborigines for the making of pure sulfur. The expedition lasted ten months.

Eventually Yu returned to Fuzhou with a memoir of his ten-months journey aboard. The memoir chronicles Yu's life in Taiwan under Qing rule when he was introduced to the unique culture of the island. It subsequently became Small Sea Travel Diaries (title sometimes translated The Small Sea Travel Records or Small Sea Travelogue). As Yu was on a mission of collecting sulfur, his book is also referred to as the Sulfur Extraction Diaries (採硫日記). The book provides first hand account of the most vivid historical records of the period.

When Yu arrived in Taiwan, the island had been under the administration of the Qing dynasty for 13 years. Not only had Yu recorded the developments of the era, he had also taken into account of the administrative structures passed down by the Dutch and Zheng dynasty.

Unlike other primary records left by conquerors and administrators in the seventeenth century, Yu's book reflects the multicultural characteristics of early Taiwan through the eyes of an adventurous and passionate literati.

See also 
 History of Taiwan
 Mining in Taiwan

References

External links 

Yu Yonghe - Oxford Reference

Historians of Taiwan
Historians from Zhejiang
1640s births
Writers from Hangzhou
Qing dynasty historians
Year of death unknown
Sulfur mining